Belgian railway line 58 connects Ghent with Eeklo. The line is approx. 14 miles long. In its early days the line also connected to Bruges.

Current condition
The railway line speed is 120 km/h. The railway is double track between Y Ledeberg (origin) and Wondelgem, and electrified between Y ledeberg and Gent-Dampoort. This last station is part of the connection between Ghent and Antwerp (Line 59).
Further is the line single track and unelectrified.

Section between Eeklo and Maldegem is run as a heritage railway line by Stoomcentrum Maldegem.

Train service
The following services currently the serve the line:

local service Eeklo - Ghent (weekdays)
rush hour service Eeklo - Ghent (weekdays)
local service Eeklo - Ghent - Ronse (weekends)

Connection tracks
58/1: Y West triangle Ledeberg (lijn 50E) - Y North triangleLedeberg (lijn 58)
58/2: Y Muide (lijn 58) - Gent-Zeehaven (lijn 59B, lijn 204/1)

References 

 This article is based on a translation of the equivalent page on the Dutch language Wikipedia

58
Railway lines opened in 1861